Can a Woman Love Twice? is a 1923 American silent drama film directed by James W. Horne and starring Ethel Clayton, Muriel Frances Dana and Kate Lester.

Synopsis
Mary Grant, a war widow, supports herself and her child by working in a cabaret. She receives an offer from Abner Grant to live at his ranch, and he mistakenly believes her to be the wife of his own son who died in World War I. Unexpectedly this son does return home alive and eventually the two become a genuine couple.

Cast
 Ethel Clayton as 	Mary Grant
 Muriel Frances Dana as Thomas Jefferson Grant Jr 
 Kate Lester as Mrs. Grant
 Fred Esmelton as Coleman Grant
 Victory Bateman as Mary's Landlady
 Wilfred Lucas as 	Franklyn Chase
 Bertram Anderson-Smith as Detective Means 
 Al Hart as Abner Grant
 Malcolm McGregor as Abner's Son
 Theodore von Eltz as Thomas Jefferson Grant
 Carrie Clark Ward as Housekeeper
 Madge Hunt as 	Nurse

References

Bibliography
 Connelly, Robert B. The Silents: Silent Feature Films, 1910-36, Volume 40, Issue 2. December Press, 1998.
 Munden, Kenneth White. The American Film Institute Catalog of Motion Pictures Produced in the United States, Part 1. University of California Press, 1997.

External links
 

1923 films
1923 drama films
1920s English-language films
American silent feature films
Silent American drama films
Films directed by James W. Horne
American black-and-white films
Film Booking Offices of America films
1920s American films